The State of Maranhão was the northern of two 17–18th century administrative divisions of the colonial Portuguese Empire in South America.

History 
In 1621 the Governorate General of Brazil was separated into two states; the State of Brazil and the State of Maranhão. The state was created on 13 June 1621 by Philip II of Portugal.

With the creation of the state Portuguese America had two administrative units: the State of Maranhão with its capital in São Luís, and the State of Brazil whose capital was São Salvador. After the 1670s Belem became the operational base of the Maranhão governors and it was formally designated the state capital in 1737.

The purpose of creating this state was to improve military defense in the Northern Region and stimulate economic activities and regional trade with the mainland.

The State of Maranhão was extinguished in 1652 and in 1654 reconstituted as Maranhão and Grão-Pará. In 1751 the State of Maranhão and Grão-Pará had its name changed to Grão-Pará and Maranhão and its capital was moved from São Luís to Belém.

Composition 
The following captaincies formed the State of Maranhão. Ceará was later detached and became a satellite of Pernambuco, in the State of Brazil.

Royal captaincies
Captaincy of Maranhão
Captaincy of Pará
Captaincy of Ceará (later became subordinate to Pernambuco)

Donatary captaincies created
Captaincy of Tapuitapera
Captaincy of Caeté
Captaincy of Cametá
Captaincy of Cabo Norte (Amapá)
Captaincy of Marajó
Captaincy of Xingu

References

External links
Relação Sumária das Cousas do Maranhão, by Simão Estácio da Silveira, a contemporary account of the early Portuguese colonization of Maranhão, published in Lisbon in 1624 by a leading coloniser
History of the Commerce of Maranhão (1612 - 1895), by Jerônimo de Viveiros
Revista do Instituto Histórico e Geográfico Brasileiro, 1909, Tomo LXXII - Parte I, Chronicle of the Jesuits in Maranhão, by João Felipe Bettendorf
Historical geographical dictionary of Maranhão, by César Marques

Maranhão
Colonial Brazil
Portuguese colonization of the Americas
Former Portuguese colonies
Former subdivisions of Brazil
1621 establishments in the Portuguese Empire